This is a list of notable events in music that took place in the year 1942.

Specific locations
1942 in British music
1942 in Norwegian music

Specific genres
1942 in country music
1942 in jazz

Events 
February 10 – Glenn Miller receives his first gold disc, for Chattanooga Choo Choo.
March 5 – World première of Shostakovich's Symphony No. 7 (Leningrad), given by the Bolshoi Theatre Orchestra conducted by Samuil Samosud at Kuybyshev in Russia and broadcast across the Soviet Union. Premières in Moscow, London and New York follow by the end of July.
March 27 – Johnny Mercer, Buddy DeSylva, and Glenn Wallichs take the first legal steps towards founding Capitol Records in the United States.
June 22 – The Paronyan Musical Comedy Theatre of Yerevan opens in Yerevan, Armenia.
July 8 – Music variety show Uncle Walter's Doghouse is broadcast for the last time on NBC radio in the United States.
July 21 – In celebration of its 25th anniversary, the Goldman Band performs a unique concert, playing all original works. This is the first time a concert of music originally composed for the wind ensemble has been performed.
August 1 – James Petrillo, leader of the American Federation of Musicians, orders a ban on musicians recording new material. The labels Decca and Capitol negotiate an end to the ban in 1943, but RCA Victor and Columbia Records hold out until 1944. The strike does not include live performances in concerts and on the radio.
August 9 – Leningrad première of Shostakovich's Symphony No. 7 with the city still under siege.
Autumn – Hans Krása's children's opera Brundibár is premiered in the Jewish orphanage in Prague after the composer has been transported to the Theresienstadt Ghetto (August 10).
 Bunk Johnson makes his first recordings.
Marianne Oswald co-stars with John Serry Sr. at The Town Hall in New York City.

Albums released
Song Hits from Holiday Inn – Bing Crosby
Selections from George Gershwin's Folk Opera Porgy and Bess – Various artists

Top popular recordings 1942

For each Year in Music (beginning 1940) and Year in Country Music (beginning 1939), a comprehensive Year End Top Records section can be found at mid-page (popular), and on the Country page. These charts are meant to replace the charts Billboard prints at the end of each year, because they are better. Keep reading.

The charts are compiled from data published by Billboard magazine, using their formulas, with slight modifications. Most important, there are no songs missing or truncated by Billboard's holiday deadline. Each year, records included enter the charts between the prior November and early December. Each week, fifteen points are awarded to the number one record, then nine points for number two, eight points for number three, and so on. This system rewards songs that reach the highest positions, as well as those that had the longest chart runs. This is our adjustment to Mr. Whitburn's formula, which places no. 1 records on top, then no 2 and so on, ordered by weeks at that position. This allows a record with 4 weeks at no. 1 that only lasted 6 weeks to be rated very high. Here, the total points of a song's complete chart run determines its position. Our chart has more songs, more weeks and may look nothing like Billboard's, but it comes from the exact same surveys. 

Before the Hot100 was implemented in 1958, Billboard magazine measured a record's performance with three charts, 'Best-Selling Popular Retail Records', 'Records Most-Played On the Air' or 'Records Most Played By Disk Jockeys' and 'Most-Played Juke Box Records'. As Billboard did starting in the 1940s, the three totals for each song are  combined, with that number determining the final year-end rank. For example, 1944's "A Hot Time in the Town of Berlin" by Bing and the Andrews Sisters finished at no. 19, despite six weeks at no. 1 on the 'Most-Played Juke Box Records'(JB) chart. It scored 126 points, to go with its Best-Selling chart (BS) total of 0. Martha Tilton's version of "I'll Walk Alone" peaked at no. 4 on the Juke Box chart, which only totalled 65 points, but her BS total was also 65, for a final total of 130, ranking no. 18. Examples like this can be found in "The Billboard" magazine up to 1958. By the way, the 'Records Most-Played On the Air' chart didn't begin until January 1945, which is why we only had two sub-totals.

Our rankings are based on Billboard data, but we also present info on recording and release dates, global sales totals, RIAA and BPI certifications and other awards. Rankings from other genres like 'Hot R&B/Hip-Hop Songs' or 'Most Played Juke Box Race Records', Country charts including 'Most Played Juke Box Folk (Hillbilly) Records', 'Cashbox magazine', and other sources are presented if they exist. We supplement our info with reliable data from the "Discography of American Historical Recordings" website, Joel Whitburn's Pop Memories 1890-1954 and other sources as specified.

Published popular music
 "C Jam Blues" music: Duke Ellington
 ""Murder", He Says!" words: Frank Loesser, music: Jimmy McHugh
 "Abraham" w.m. Irving Berlin
 "Ain't Got A Dime To My Name" w. Johnny Burke m. Jimmy Van Heusen
 "At Last" w. Mack Gordon m. Harry Warren
 "Baltimore Oriole" w. Paul Francis Webster & Hoagy Carmichael
 "Be Careful, It's My Heart" w.m. Irving Berlin
 "Be Like the Kettle and Sing" w.m. Connor, O'Connor & Ridley
 "Boom Shot" w. Glenn Miller & Billy May, under pseudonym Arletta May
 "Born To Lose" w.m. Frankie Brown
 "Constantly" w. Johnny Burke m. Jimmy Van Heusen. Introduced by Bing Crosby in the film Road to Morocco
 "Cow-Cow Boogie" w.m. Don Raye, Gene de Paul & Benny Carter
 "Dearly Beloved" w. Johnny Mercer m. Jerome Kern
 "Don't Get Around Much Anymore" w. Bob Russell m. Duke Ellington
 "Don't Sit Under the Apple Tree" w. Lew Brown & Charles Tobias m. Sam H. Stept
 "Ev'rything I've Got" w. Lorenz Hart m. Richard Rodgers from the musical By Jupiter
 "Glissando" m. John Serry, Sr.
 "Happiness Is Just A Thing Called Joe" w. E. Y. Harburg m. Harold Arlen
 "Happy Holiday" w.m. Irving Berlin
 "Holiday for Strings" m. David Rose
 "The House I Live In" w.m. Earl Robinson & Lewis Allan
 "I Came Here To Talk For Joe" w. Charles Tobias & Lew Brown m. Sam H. Stept
 "I Get the Neck of the Chicken" w. Frank Loesser m. Jimmy McHugh. Introduced by Marcy McGuire in the film Seven Days' Leave
 "I Had the Craziest Dream" w. Mack Gordon m. Harry Warren. Introduced by Helen Forrest with Harry James and his Music in the film Springtime in the Rockies.
 "I Heard You Cried Last Night" w. Jerrie Kruger m. Ted Grouya
 "I Left My Heart At The Stage Door Canteen" w.m. Irving Berlin
 "I Lost My Sugar In Salt Lake City" w.m. Leon René & Johnny Lange
 "I Threw A Kiss In The Ocean" w.m. Irving Berlin
 "If You Are But A Dream" w.m. Moe Jaffe, Jack Fulton & Nat Bonx
 "If You Build A Better Mousetrap" Johnny Mercer, Victor Schertzinger
 "I'll Be Around" w.m. Alec Wilder
 "I'll Capture Your Heart" w.m. Irving Berlin
 "I'll Take Tallulah" w. E. Y. Harburg m. Burton Lane
 "I'm Getting Tired So I Can Sleep" w.m. Irving Berlin
 "I'm Old Fashioned" w. Johnny Mercer m. Jerome Kern
 "In The Blue Of Evening" w. Tom Adair m. Alfred D'Artega
 "It Must Be Jelly ('Cause Jam Don't Shake Like That)" w. Sunny Skylar m. Chummy MacGregor & George Williams
 "It Started All Over Again" w. Bill Carey m. Carl Fischer
 "(I've Got a Gal In) Kalamazoo" w. Mack Gordon m. Harry Warren
 "I've Heard That Song Before" w. Sammy Cahn m. Jule Styne
 "Jingle Jangle Jingle" w. Frank Loesser m. Joseph J. Lilley
 "Johnny Doughboy Found A Rose In Ireland" w. Kay Twomey m. Al Goodhart
 "Juke Box Saturday Night" w. Al Stillman m. Paul McGrane
 "The Lamplighter's Serenade" w. Paul Francis Webster m. Hoagy Carmichael
 "Let's Get Lost" w. Frank Loesser m. Jimmy McHugh
 "Let's Start The New Year Right" w.m. Irving Berlin
 "Lover Man" w.m. Jimmy Davis, Roger "Ram"Ramirez & Jimmy Sherman
 "Mad About Him, Sad About Him, How Can I Be Glad About Him Blues" w.m. Larry Markes & Dick Charles
 "Mister Five By Five" w.m. Don Raye & Gene de Paul
 "Moonlight Becomes You" w. Johnny Burke m. Jimmy Van Heusen
 "My Devotion" w.m. Roc Hillman & Johnny Napton
 "One Dozen Roses" w. Roger Lewis & Country Washburn m. Dick Jurgens & Walter Donovan
 "Pennsylvania Polka" w.m. Lester Lee & Zeke Manners
 "People Like You And Me" w. Mack Gordon m. Harry Warren
 "Perdido" w. Hans Lengsfelder & Ervin Drake m. Juan Tizol
 "Pistol Packin' Mama" w.m. Al Dexter
 "Praise the Lord and Pass the Ammunition" w.m. Frank Loesser
 "Put Your Dreams Away" w.m. Ruth Lowe, Stephan Weiss & Paul Mann
 "The Road To Morocco" w. Johnny Burke m. Jimmy Van Heusen
 "Rose Ann Of Charing Cross" w. Kermit Goell m. Mabel Wayne
 "Serenade in Blue" w. Mack Gordon m. Harry Warren
 "Skylark" w. Johnny Mercer m. Hoagy Carmichael
 "Strip Polka" w.m. Johnny Mercer
 "That Old Black Magic" w. Johnny Mercer m. Harold Arlen
 "That's Sabotage" w. Mack Gordon m. Harry Warren
 "There Are Such Things" w.m. Stanley Adams, Abel Baer & George W. Meyer
 "There Will Never Be Another You" w. Mack Gordon m. Harry Warren
 "There's A Star Spangled Banner Waving Somewhere" w.m. Paul Roberts & Shelby Darnell
 "This Is The Army, Mr Jones" w.m. Irving Berlin
 "This Is Worth Fighting For" w. Eddie De Lange m. Sam H. Stept
 "Three Little Sisters" w.m. Irving Taylor & Vic Mizzy
 "Trav'lin' Light" w. Sidney Clare m. Harry Akst
 "There Won't Be a Shortage of Love" w.m. Carmen Lombardo and John Jacob Loeb
 "Tweedle-O-Twill" w.m. Gene Autry & Fred Rose
 "Wait Till You See Her" w. Lorenz Hart m. Richard Rodgers. Introduced by Ronnie Graham in the musical By Jupiter
 "Warsaw Concerto" m. Richard Addinsell
 "Well, Git It!" m. Sy Oliver
 "When the Lights Go On Again" w.m. Eddie Seiler, Sol Marcus & Bennie Benjamin
 "White Christmas" w.m. Irving Berlin
 "Who Wouldn't Love You?" w. Bill Carey m. Carl Fischer
 "Why Don't You Do Right?" w.m. Joe McCoy
 "Why Don't You Fall In Love With Me?" w. Al Lewis m. Mabel Wayne
 "You Were Never Lovelier" w. Johnny Mercer m. Jerome Kern
 "You'd Be So Nice To Come Home To" w.m. Cole Porter. Performed in the 1943 musical film Something to Shout About by Don Ameche and Janet Blair.

Classical music

Premieres

Compositions
Arthur Benjamin – Concerto for Oboe on Themes by Cimarosa
Alessandro Casagrande – Messa, in re minore, per soli coro e orchestra
 Aaron Copland
Fanfare for the Common Man
Rodeo (ballet)
Lincoln Portrait
Gerald Finzi – Let Us Garlands Bring Op. 18, song cycle on texts by Shakespeare
 Camargo Guarnieri – Abertura Concertante
 Carlos Guastavino – Once Upon A Time (ballet)
 Roy Harris – Symphony No. 5
Paul Hindemith – "Abendständchen," "Abendwolke" (Lieder)
 Aram Khachaturian – Gayane (ballet)
 Paul von Klenau
 Symphony No. 8 Im Alten Stil
 String Quartet No. 2
Raoul Koczalski – Kleine Sonate, Op. 146
Charles Koechlin
Fourteen pieces for oboe and piano, Op. 179
Fifteen pieces for horn and piano, Op. 180
Three sonatines for solo flute, Op. 184
Suite for solo English horn, Op. 185
Twenty-four duos for two saxophones Op. 186
 Bohuslav Martinů
Madrigal-Sonata, H. 291
Piano Quartet No. 1
Variations on a Theme of Rossini, H. 290
Selim Palmgren
Sun & Clouds, 12 Pieces for Piano, Op. 102
Jouluaatto ("Christmas Morning") for Chorus and Orchestra, Op. 103a
 Robert de Roos – String Quartet No. 2
 Arnold Schoenberg – Piano Concerto, Op. 42
 John Serry Sr. – Tarantella for Stradella Accordion
 Nikos Skalkottas
 Double Bass Concerto
 Little Suite for strings
Richard Strauss – Horn Concerto No. 2, TrV 283
 Igor Stravinsky – Four Norwegian Moods
 Heitor Villa-Lobos – String Quartet No. 7

Opera
Dmitry Kabalevsky – In the Fire

Film
Frank Churchill – Bambi
Erich Korngold – Kings Row
Max Steiner – Now, Voyager

Jazz

Musical theatre
 By Jupiter, Broadway production opened at the Shubert Theatre on June 2 and ran for 421 performances
 Du Barry Was A Lady, London production opened at His Majesty's Theatre on October 22 and ran for 178 performances
 Let's Face It!, London production opened at the Hippodrome on November 19 and ran for 348 performances
 Priorities of 1942 Broadway Revue opened March 12 at the 46th Street Theatre and ran for 353 performances.
 Show Time Broadway Revue opened September 16 at the Broadhurst Theatre and ran for 342 performances.
 Star and Garter Broadway Revue opened on June 24 at the Music Box Theatre and ran for 605 performances.
 Stars on Ice Broadway Revue opened July 2 at the Center Theatre and ran for 827 performances.
 This Is the Army Broadway Revue opened July 4 at the Broadway Theatre and ran for 113 performances.

Musical films
 Academia El Tango Argentino, starring Warly Ceriani.
 Almost Married, starring Jane Frazee, Robert Paige, Eugene Pallette and Elizabeth Patterson. Directed by Charles Lamont.
 Bala Nagamma, starring Kanchanamala.
 The Balloon Goes Up, starring Ethel Revnell, Gracie West, Donald Peers and Ronald Shiner. Directed by Redd Davis.
 Bambi
 Behind the Eight Ball, starring The Ritz Brothers, Carol Bruce, Dick Foran, Grace McDonald, Johnny Downs and William Demarest. Directed by Edward F. Cline.
 Bhakta Potana, starring V. Nagayya.
 Born To Sing, starring Virginia Weidler, Ray McDonald, Leo Gorcey and Rags Ragland. Directed by Edward Ludwig.
 Broadway, starring George Raft, Pat O'Brien, Janet Blair, Broderick Crawford and Marjorie Rambeau. Directed by William A. Seiter.
 Cairo, starring Jeanette MacDonald, Robert Young and Ethel Waters.
 The Fleet's In, starring Dorothy Lamour, William Holden, Eddie Bracken and Betty Hutton, and featuring Jimmy Dorsey & his Orchestra with vocals by Bob Eberly and Helen O'Connell.
 Footlight Serenade, starring Betty Grable and John Payne.
 For Me and My Gal, starring Judy Garland and Gene Kelly.
 Get Hep to Love, starring Gloria Jean, Donald O'Connor, Jane Frazee, Robert Paige, Peggy Ryan and Cora Sue Collins
 Give Out, Sisters, starring Laverne Andrews, Patty Andrews, Maxene Andrews, Dan Dailey and Donald O'Connor
 I Married An Angel, starring Jeanette MacDonald, Nelson Eddy and Edward Everett Horton.
 Joan of Ozark, starring Judy Canova, Joe E. Brown and Eddie Foy Jr.
 King Arthur Was a Gentleman, starring Arthur Askey, Evelyn Dall and Anne Shelton
 Melodías de América, directed by Eduardo Morera
 Moonlight in Havana, starring Allan Jones and Jane Frazee
 My Favorite Spy, starring Kay Kyser & his Band, Ellen Drew and Jane Wyman. Directed by Tay Garnett.
 Orchestra Wives, starring Ann Rutherford, George Montgomery, and Glenn Miller.
 Panama Hattie, starring Red Skelton, Ann Sothern, Virginia O'Brien and Dan Dailey, and featuring Lena Horne.
 Priorities on Parade, starring Ann Miller, Johnnie Johnston, Jerry Colonna and Betty Jane Rhodes
 Rhythm Parade, starring Nils T. Grunland, Gale Storm, Robert Lowery, The Mills Brothers and Ted Fio Rito and his Orchestra. Directed by Dave Gould and Howard Bretherton.
 Ride 'Em Cowboy, starring Bud Abbott, Lou Costello and Dick Foran and featuring Ella Fitzgerald and The Merry Macs.
 Rio Rita, starring Bud Abbott, Lou Costello, Kathryn Grayson and John Carroll
 Road To Morocco, starring Bing Crosby, Bob Hope and Dorothy Lamour.
 Rose of Tralee, starring John Longden, Lesley Brook and Angela Glynne.
 Seven Days' Leave, starring Victor Mature, Lucille Ball and Buddy Clark and featuring Ginny Simms, Les Brown & his Orchestra and Freddy Martin & his Orchestra
 Ship Ahoy, starring Eleanor Powell and Red Skelton.
 Sleepytime Gal, released March 5, starring Judy Canova and Ruth Terry and featuring Skinnay Ennis & his Orchestra.
 Springtime in the Rockies, released November 6, starring Carmen Miranda, Betty Grable and John Payne and featuring Harry James and his Music and Six Hits and a Miss.
 Star Spangled Rhythm, starring Betty Hutton and Eddie Bracken, and featuring Bing Crosby, Bob Hope, Dorothy Lamour, Paulette Goddard, Veronica Lake, Mary Martin, Dick Powell and Vera Zorina.
 Strictly in the Groove, starring Mary Healy, Richard Davies and Leon Errol and featuring Martha Tilton, The Dinning Sisters and Ozzie Nelson & his Band
 Sweater Girl, released July 13, starring Eddie Bracken and June Preisser and featuring Betty Jane Rhodes.
 We'll Smile Again, starring Bud Flanagan, Chesney Allen and Meinhart Maur.
 Yankee Doodle Dandy, starring James Cagney, Joan Leslie, Irene Manning and Frances Langford.
 You Were Never Lovelier, starring Fred Astaire and Rita Hayworth.

Births
January 1
F. R. David, French musician
Kornelije Kovač, Serbian composer
Country Joe McDonald, American psychedelic rock singer (The "Fish" Cheer/I-Feel-Like-I'm-Fixin'-to-Die Rag)
Judy Stone, Australian singer-songwriter
January 4
 Precious Bryant, American singer-songwriter and guitarist (died 2013)
 John McLaughlin, English guitarist, bandleader and composer
January 5 – Maurizio Pollini, pianist
January 8 – John Petersen (The Beau Brummels, Harpers Bizarre) (died 2007)
January 11 – Clarence Clemons, musician (died 2011)
January 16
William Francis (Dr. Hook & The Medicine Show)
Barbara Lynn, R&B guitarist and singer
January 18
 Bobby Goldsboro, singer-songwriter
 Ruby Winters, American singer (died 2016)
January 19
 Michael Crawford, English actor, singer and entertainer
 Nara Leão, Brazilian singer (died 1989)
January 20 – William Powell (The O'Jays) (died 1977)
January 21 – Edwin Starr, singer (died 2003)
January 30 – Marty Balin, vocalist (Jefferson Airplane) (died 2018)
February 2 – Graham Nash, singer-songwriter (The Hollies) (Crosby, Stills, Nash & Young)
February 5 – Cory Wells, vocalist (Three Dog Night) (died 2015)
February 8 – Terry Melcher, American singer-songwriter and producer (Bruce & Terry) (died 2004)
February 9 – Carole King, singer-songwriter
February 11 – Otis Clay, gospel/R&B-singer (died 2016)
February 13 – Peter Tork, pop musician/actor (The Monkees) (died 2019)
February 15 – Glyn Johns, recording engineer
February 19 – Phil Coulter, folk musician and songwriter
February 28 – Brian Jones, rock musician (The Rolling Stones) (died 1969)
March 2
Lou Reed, singer-songwriter (died 2013)
Meir Ariel, Israeli musician (died 1999)
March 3 – Mike Pender, vocalist (The Searchers)
March 13
Meic Stevens, singer-songwriter
Scatman John, American music artist, known for scat singing and dance music fusion (died 1999)
March 15 – Jerry Jeff Walker, country singer (died 2020)
March 20 – Robin Luke, rockabilly singer
March 25 – Aretha Franklin, soul singer (died 2018)
March 28 – Samuel Ramey, operatic bass
April 1
Alan Blakely (The Tremeloes)
Phil Margo (The Tokens) (died 2021)
Danny Brooks (The Dovells)
April 2
Phil Castrodale (The Reflections)
Leon Russell, singer-songwriter, pianist and guitarist (died 2016)
April 3
Wayne Newton, singer
Billy Joe Royal, singer (died 2015)
April 4 – Major Lance, R&B singer (died 1994)
April 5 – Allan Clarke, singer (The Hollies)
April 8 – Roger Chapman, vocalist (Family)
April 18 – Mike Vickers (Manfred Mann)
April 19
Alan Price, singer-songwriter and keyboard player
Clive Strutt, composer
April 24 – Barbra Streisand, US singer and actress
April 26 – Bobby Rydell, US singer and sometime actor (died 2022)
April 27 – Jim Keltner, US rock session drummer
April 29 – Vini Poncia, songwriter (Tradewinds)
May 1 – Charlie Allen, singer-songwriter (died 1990)
May 4 – Nick Ashford (Ashford & Simpson) (died 2011)
May 5 – Tammy Wynette, country singer (died 1998)
May 6 – Colin Earl (Mungo Jerry)
May 9 – Tommy Roe, singer
May 12
Ian Dury, singer-songwriter (died 2000)
Billy Swan, singer and songwriter
May 18 – Albert Hammond, singer-songwriter
May 20 – Jill Jackson ("Paula"), singer
May 23 – Fred Wedlock, folk singer (died 2010)
May 26 – Ray Ennis (The Swinging Blue Jeans)
June 3 – Curtis Mayfield, singer, songwriter and record producer (died 1999)
June 6 – Paul Esswood, countertenor
June 8 – Chuck Negron (Three Dog Night)
June 12 – Len Barry, singer (died 2020)
June 15 – Birgitte Alsted, Danish violinist, teacher and composer
June 16 – Edward Levert (O'Jays)
June 18
Paul McCartney, singer, songwriter and composer
Hans Vonk, Dutch conductor (died 2004)
June 19
Elaine "Spanky" McFarlane (Spanky and Our Gang)
Ralna English, American singer
June 20 – Brian Wilson, songwriter
June 24 – Mick Fleetwood, drummer
June 27 – Bruce Johnston, American musician (The Beach Boys)
June 28 – David Miner (The Great Society), musician and record producer
July 4 – Peter Rowan, American singer-songwriter and guitarist (Earth Opera) (Old & In the Way)
July 5 – Matthias Bamert, conductor
July 11 – Tomasz Stańko, free jazz trumpeter (died 2018)
July 12
Swamp Dogg, soul singer
Steve Young, country singer (died 2016)
July 13
Stephen Jo Bladd (The J. Geils Band)
Roger McGuinn (The Byrds)
Jay Uzzell (The Corsairs)
July 18 – Bobby Susser, American songwriter and producer (died 2020)
July 25 – Bruce Woodly (The Seekers)
July 27 – Kim Fowley, record producer and songwriter (died 2015)
August 1 – Jerry Garcia, guitarist (Grateful Dead) (died 1995)
August 5 – Rick Huxley, pop bass guitarist (The Dave Clark Five) (died 2013)
August 7
B. J. Thomas, singer (died 2021)
Caetano Veloso, Brazilian singer/songwriter
August 8 – Jay David (Dr. Hook & the Medicine Show)
August 11 – Guy Villari (The Regents)
August 16 – Barbara George, R&B singer-songwriter (died 2006)
August 20 – Isaac Hayes, soul and funk musician (died 2008)
August 22 – Joseph Chambers (The Chambers Brothers)
August 25 – Walter Williams (O'Jays)
August 27 – Daryl Dragon (The Captain & Tennille) (died 2019)
August 29 – Sterling Morrison (The Velvet Underground) (died 1995)
September 3 – Al Jardine (The Beach Boys)
September 4 – Merald "Bubba" Knight (Gladys Knight and the Pips)
September 8 – Sal Valentino (The Beau Brummels)
September 10 – Danny Hutton (Three Dog Night)
September 15 – Lee Dorman, bassist (died 2012)
September 16 – Bernie Calvert (The Hollies)
September 19
Danny Kalb (Blues Project)
Freda Payne, singer
September 21
Jill Gomez, soprano
U-Roy, born Ewart Beckford, reggae musician, pioneer of toasting (Jamaican music) (died 2021)
September 24
Phyllis Allbut, pop singer (The Angels)
Ilkka "Danny" Lipsanen, Finnish singer
Gerry Marsden, Merseybeat singer-songwriter (Gerry & the Pacemakers) and actor (died 2021)
September 27 – Alvin Stardust, singer (died 2014)
September 28 – Tim Maia, Brazilian singer and songwriter (died 1998)
September 29 – Jean-Luc Ponty, violinist
September 30
Gus Dudgeon, record producer (died 2002)
Mike Harrison, (Spooky Tooth) (died 2018)
Frankie Lymon, singer (died 1968)
October 5 
Billy Scott, American singer-songwriter (died 2012)
Richard Street (The Temptations) (died 2013)
October 12
Melvin Franklin (The Temptations) (died 1995)
Daliah Lavi, Israeli actress and singer (died 2017)
October 17 – Gary Puckett, singer
October 21 – Elvin Bishop, guitarist
October 22
Annette Funicello, singer and actress (died 2013)
Bobby Fuller (The Bobby Fuller Four) (died 1966)
October 24 – Don Gant, singer/songwriter, record producer (died 1987)
October 26 – Milton Nascimento, Brazilian singer/songwriter
October 27 – Lee Greenwood, country singer-songwriter
November 5 – Pierangelo Bertoli, Italian singer-songwriter (died 2002)
November 7 – Johnny Rivers, singer, songwriter, guitarist and record producer
November 13
John P. Hammond, blues singer and guitarist
Roger Lee Hall, composer and musicologist
November 15 – Daniel Barenboim, pianist and conductor
November 17 – Bob Gaudio (The Four Seasons)
November 20
Norman Greenbaum, singer
Meredith Monk, composer
November 27 – Jimi Hendrix, rock guitarist (died 1970)
December 7 – Harry Chapin, singer-songwriter (died 1981)
December 8 - Toots Hibbert, reggae singer-songwriter (Toots and the Maytals) (died 2020)
December 13 – Neil Aspinall, road manager for The Beatles (died 2008)
December 17 – Paul Butterfield, blues musician and singer (died 1987)
December 29
Dinah Christie, English-born Canadian actress and singer
Jerry Summers, American doo-wop singer (The Dovells)
December 30 – Michael Nesmith, pop singer-songwriter (The Monkees) (died 2021)
December 31 – Andy Summers, guitarist (The Police), (Eric Burdon & the Animals)

Deaths
January 1 – Jaroslav Ježek, composer, 35 (kidney disease)
January 2 – Henriette Gottlieb, operatic soprano, 57
January 4 – Leon Jessel, composer, 70
January 14
Harry Champion, music hall composer, 76
Fred Fisher, songwriter, 66
February 15 – Stanislav Binički, Serbian composer, conductor and music teacher, 69
February 22
Vera Timanova, Russian pianist, 87
Stefan Zweig, Jewish librettist of Richard Strauss, 60
February 25
Leo Ascher, composer and songwriter, 61
Sidney D. Mitchell, composer and songwriter, 53
March 2 – Charlie Christian, jazz guitarist, 25 (tuberculosis)
March 11 – Reginald Stoneham songwriter and composer
March 15 – Alexander von Zemlinsky, conductor and composer, 70
March 20 – Aksel Agerby, composer, organist, and music administrator, 52
April 3 – Paul Gilson, composer, 76
April 11 – Frederick Hobbs, singer, actor and theatre manager, 61
April 27 – Emil von Sauer, pianist and composer, 79
May 7 – Felix Weingartner, editor and conductor, (born 1863)
May 14 – Frank Churchill, US composer, 40 (suicide)
May 15 – T-Bone Slim, poet and songwriter (born 1880)
May 26 – Libero Bovio, Neapolitan lyricist, 68
June 2 – Bunny Berigan, jazz trumpeter, 33 (hemorrhage)
June 12
Ernst Heuser, composer, 79
Walter Leigh, composer, 36 (killed in action)
June 17 – Jessie Bond, singer and actress in Gilbert & Sullivan, 89
June 18
Arthur Pryor, trombonist and bandleader, 71
Daniel Alomía Robles, Peruvian composer and musicologist, 71
July 30
Jimmy Blanton, jazz double-bassist, 23 (tuberculosis)
Dorothy Silk, soprano, 59
August 12 – Pasquale Amato, operatic baritone, 64
August 18 – Erwin Schulhoff, pianist and composer, 48 (tuberculosis)
August 22 – Michel Fokine, dancer and choreographer, 62
August 28 – Caleb Simper, organist and composer, 85
September 9 – William Murdoch, arranger and pianist (born 1888)
October 7 – Norman Gale, lyricist and writer (born 1862)
October 15 – Dame Marie Tempest, opera and musical comedy singer, 78
October 23 – Ralph Rainger, US composer and pianist, 41 (air crash)
November 1 – Hugo Distler, composer, 34 (suicide)
November 5 – George M. Cohan, songwriter and music hall star, 64
November 24 – Peadar Kearney, lyricist of the Irish national anthem, 58
December 3 – Wilhelm Peterson-Berger, Swedish composer (born 1867)
December 18 – António D'Andrade, opera singer, 88
December 20 – Jean Gilbert, composer and conductor, 63
December 21 – Francis Bousquet, French composer of classical music, 52
December 23 – Konstantin Balmont, dedicatee and lyricist, 75
December 25 – George L. Cobb, ragtime composer, 56

References

 
20th century in music
Music by year